Metacanthinae is a subfamily of stilt bugs in the family Berytidae. There are about 12 genera and 80 described species in Metacanthinae.

Genera
These 12 genera belong to the subfamily Metacanthinae:

 Cametanthus Stusak, 1967
 Capyella Breddin, 1907
 Dimorphoberytus Stusak, 1965
 Jalysus Stal, 1862
 Metacanthus Costa, 1847
 Metatropis Fieber, 1859
 Neostusakia Kment, Henry & Frýda, 2009
 Pneustocerus Horvath, 1905
 Tirybenus Stusak, 1964
 Triconulus Horvath, 1905
 Yemma Horvath, 1905
 Yemmalysus Stusak, 1972

References

Further reading

External links

 

Berytidae